Selica Winiata (born 14 November 1986) is a New Zealand Rugby union player and referee.

Biography 
In 2013, she was a member of the champion New Zealand women's sevens team at the Rugby World Cup Sevens. Winiata also played at the 2014 Women's Rugby World Cup. She was included in New Zealand's squad to play at the 2015 Women's Rugby Super Series.

Winiata was named New Zealand Rugby women's player of the year in 2016. She is a Police officer by profession. She was named in the squad for the 2017 Women's Rugby World Cup. She also featured at the 2019 Women's Rugby Super Series.

Winiata signed with the Hurricanes Poua for the inaugural 2022 season of Super Rugby Aupiki.

References

External links
 Selica Winiata at Black Ferns

1986 births
Living people
New Zealand women's international rugby union players
New Zealand female rugby union players
New Zealand female rugby sevens players
New Zealand women's international rugby sevens players
Manawatu rugby union players
New Zealand police officers
Women police officers